Sir Peter George Osborne, 17th Baronet (born 29 June 1943) is a British businessman, who co-founded the interior design firm Osborne & Little in 1968. He is the father of George Osborne, the Conservative politician and former Chancellor of the Exchequer.

Early life
Peter Osborne was born on 29 June 1943. He is the elder son of Sir George Osborne, 16th Baronet, who as a soldier was decorated during the First World War, and Mary Horn. Osborne was educated at Wellington College, Berkshire, and received an MA from Christ Church, Oxford. He succeeded to the baronetcy, becoming the 17th Osborne baronet of Ballentaylor and Ballylemon, on 21 July 1960, upon the death of his father.

Career
In 1968, Osborne and his brother-in-law Anthony Little co-founded Osborne & Little, a successful manufacturer and retailer of upmarket wallpaper and fabrics, opening its initial showroom in Chelsea. It was revealed in 2016 that the firm had made £6 million in a 2004 property deal with a developer from the British Virgin Islands, a tax haven, and had not paid any corporation tax for seven years. Osborne's personal wealth, amassed through inheritance and his business career, has been the subject of controversy during his son's political career, especially after an interview with the Financial Times in which he discussed his "expensive tastes", such as the purchase of a £19,000 Italian desk.

Personal life
Osborne married Felicity Loxton-Peacock on 16 October 1968. They have four children:
 George Gideon Oliver Osborne CH (b. 23 May 1971), former Chancellor of the Exchequer (2010–2016) and heir apparent to the baronetcy
 Benedict George Osborne (b. 25 July 1973)
 Adam Peter Osborne (b. 25 March 1976)
 Theo Grantley Osborne (b. 28 March 1985)

Arms

See also 
 Osborne & Little
 Osborne baronets
 George Osborne

References 

1943 births
20th-century Anglo-Irish people
People educated at Wellington College, Berkshire
Alumni of Christ Church, Oxford
Living people
Osborne baronets